is a Japanese ice sledge hockey player. He was part of the Japanese sledge hockey team that won a silver medal at the 2010 Winter Paralympics.

His right leg was amputated due to a tumour at age 17.

References

External links 
 

1973 births
Living people
Japanese sledge hockey players
Paralympic sledge hockey players of Japan
Paralympic silver medalists for Japan
Ice sledge hockey players at the 1998 Winter Paralympics
Ice sledge hockey players at the 2002 Winter Paralympics
Ice sledge hockey players at the 2006 Winter Paralympics
Ice sledge hockey players at the 2010 Winter Paralympics
Para ice hockey players at the 2018 Winter Paralympics
Medalists at the 2010 Winter Paralympics
People from Tachikawa
Sportspeople from Tokyo
Japanese amputees
Paralympic medalists in sledge hockey